This a list of elementary schools in the Toronto District School Board (TDSB).  The TDSB is Canada's largest school board and was created in 1998 by the merger of the Board of Education for the City of York, the East York Board of Education, the North York Board of Education, the Scarborough Board of Education, the Etobicoke Board of Education and the Toronto Board of Education. The TDSB manages 451 elementary schools.

School types
TDSB institutions that provide primary education consist of:
Public schools - a basic primary school that provides primary education, most commonly providing schooling from Junior Kindergarten (JK) to Grade 8. Elementary schools that offer schooling from JK to Grade 5, or JK to Grade 6, are known as a junior public school (used by schools formerly operated by the Scarborough Board of Education) or junior school (used by some schools, including the former Etobicoke Board of Education). Other terms used by TDSB to identify elementary schools includes junior middle school/academy, found on most elementary schools in Etobicoke; as well as community school, found in various places in the schools of the former Toronto Board of Education.
 Middle schools - that offer intermediate levels of schooling, from grades 6 to 8. Intermediate schools formerly operated by the Scarborough Board of Education use the term "senior public school" in place of middle school. Some middle schools were formerly tiled "junior high school," and some taught from grades 7 to 9.

Standards and curriculum
EQAO scores are broadly in line with provincial standards. Specifically, elementary schools in the TDSB 75% of grade 3 students met the provincial standard (compared to 75% provincial average, 72% met the writing provincial standard (compared to 74% provincial average), and 61% met the mathematics provincial standard (compare to 62% provincial average). Elementary schools in the TDSB 82% of grade 6 students met the provincial standard (compared to 81% provincial average), 80% met the writing provincial standard (compared to 81% provincial average), and 49% met the mathematics provincial standard (compare to 52% provincial average).One school, Avondale Elementary Alternative School scored a perfect 10 in the Fraser Institute's 16th annual "Report Card on Ontario's Elementary Schools", the only secular public school in Toronto to do so.

In order to help to meet Provincial budget reductions, in June 2019 TDSB stopped offering the International Baccalaureate program for elementary students.

Elementary schools
Last updated: July 2019

See also
List of Toronto District School Board secondary schools

List of educational institutions in Etobicoke
List of educational institutions in Scarborough
List of schools in the Conseil scolaire catholique MonAvenir
List of schools in the Conseil scolaire Viamonde
List of schools in the Toronto Catholic District School Board

References

 
Toronto District School Board